Thomas A. McCann was an American football coach.  He served as the head football coach at Bowdoin College from 1913 to 1914 and at the University of Maine in 1917, compiling a career college football record of 6–13–2.  Before coaching at Bowdoin, McCann coached football at Bangor High School in Bangor, Maine.

Head coaching record

College

References

Year of birth missing
Year of death missing
Bowdoin Polar Bears football coaches
Maine Black Bears football coaches
High school football coaches in Maine